Vesta Creek is a stream in the municipalities of Arran–Elderslie and Brockton, Bruce County in Southwestern Ontario, Canada. It is in the Lake Huron drainage basin and is a right tributary of the Saugeen River.

Course
The Saugeen River flows to Lake Huron.

References

Rivers of Bruce County